East Cleveland is the name of the following places:

In the United States of America:
East Cleveland, Ohio
East Cleveland, Tennessee
In the United Kingdom:
Redcar and Cleveland
Middlesbrough South and East Cleveland parliament constituency